Bina D'Costa is an Australian-Bangladeshi academic who specializes in conflict and gender studies in South Asia.

Career 
D'Costa was at the Global Justice Center in New York City in 2008. D'Costa was a professor of International Relations at the Coral Bell School of Asia Pacific Affairs of the Australian National University. She was a visiting scholar at the Graduate Institute of International and Development Studies, Geneva from 2012 to 2014. She was a visiting scholar at the Refugee Studies Centre under Department of International Development of University of Oxford from 2011 to 2012. She served as the Asia Rapporteur of Asia-Europe Meeting in 2017. She is a member of the Dristhipat Writers' Collective.

Publications and research
In her 2011 book Nation Building, Gender, and War Crimes in South Asia, D'Costa wrote about the murder of Bihari citizens during the Bangladesh Liberation war. The Daily Star described her book as a "mammoth task"; she provided a gendered analysis of conflict in South Asia. She has also carried out research on Birangona, rape victims of the Bangladesh Liberation war. She also tracked down Australian doctor Geoffrey Davis, who carried abortions for rape victims after the war ended.

D'Costa has written on how Rohingya people have been excluded and marginalized by the government of Myanmar.

Published works 

 Gender and Global Politics in the Asia-Pacific (2010)
 Nationbuilding, Gender and War Crimes in South Asia (2011)
 Children and Global Conflict (2015)
 Children and Violence: The Politics of Conflict in South Asia (2016)
 Cascades of Violence: War, Crime and Peacebuilding Across South Asia (2018)

References 

Living people
Year of birth missing (living people)
Bangladeshi academics
Academic staff of the Australian National University
Australian people of Bangladeshi descent